The New Politics Network was an independent political and campaigning think tank in the United Kingdom, concerned with democratic renewal and popular participation in politics. It was founded as the successor to Democratic Left in 1999, and merged with Charter 88 to form Unlock Democracy in 2007.

Origin
The NPN was established in December 1999 following the winding up of Democratic Left, the legal successor  organisation to the former Communist Party of Great Britain. Its first director was Nina Temple. Democratic Left had briefly become the New Times Network, publishing a magazine, New Times, until the summer of 1999, before it became the NPN.

Activities
The NPN had around 200-250 members. The NPN worked with a wide range of groups and individuals to provide a forum to look at emerging ideas in society. Its stated goal was to provide an independent and innovative debate on the future of politics. With the Joseph Rowntree Reform Trust it funded the tactical voting website Tacticalvoter.net during the 2001 general election, although it was not involved with the 2005 campaign of the same name.

While it was predicted by Nick Cohen in the New Statesman in 2000 that NPN would merge with Make Votes Count and Charter 88, Nina Temple among others attempted to steer the organisation back towards its democratic socialist roots at the 2003 AGM. If this had been successful, the organisation may well have ended up as part of the Compass pressure group.

The NPN owned an office block in Islington, north London, a property company called Rodell, and an office in the Midlands.

Merger
In November 2007 the NPN, by then directed by Peter Facey, merged with Charter 88 to form a new campaigning group, Unlock Democracy. The contribution of NPN to this merger was substantially financial, due to the dire situation in which Charter 88 had found itself. The NPN strapline "connecting people and politics" was however, retained.

See also
 List of UK think tanks

References

 Background Information on the Proposed Merger between Charter 88 and the New Politics Network (jointly printed pamphlet, 2007)

External links
Unlock Democracy
New Politics Net on the Internet Archive
Guardian profile

Political and economic think tanks based in the United Kingdom
Communist Party of Great Britain